Burn is the eighth studio album by the English rock band Deep Purple, released in February 1974, and the first to feature then-unknown David Coverdale on vocals and Glenn Hughes, from Trapeze, on bass and vocals.

Recording
The album was recorded in Montreux, Switzerland, in November 1973, with the Rolling Stones Mobile Studio. With the addition of David Coverdale and Glenn Hughes, Purple's hard rock sound became more boogie-oriented, incorporating elements of soul and funk, which would become much more prominent on the follow-up album, Stormbringer.

Hughes participated in song-writing, but was not given credit due to unexpired contractual obligations. However, the 30th anniversary edition of the album included Hughes in the credits for all the tracks except "Sail Away", "Mistreated", "'A' 200" and the bonus track "Coronarias Redig".

Release and reception

Burn hit number 3 on the UK Albums Chart, number 9 on the US Billboard 200, and number one in four European countries.

In 2004 Burn was remastered and released with bonus tracks. "Coronarias Redig" was recorded during the Burn recording sessions, used only as a B-side for the "Might Just Take Your Life" single in 1974. It appears as a bonus track (in remixed form) on the anniversary edition re-release. The 2004 remix version of "Burn" was later used in Guitar Hero: Warriors of Rock.

In 2005 an unauthorised documentary about the album was produced as part of "The Ultimate Critical Review" series. It featured brand new interview with Glenn Hughes.

Lead single "Might Just Take Your Life", released 4 March, was Deep Purple's first UK single in two years.

Legacy
In a retrospective review for AllMusic,  Eduardo Rivadavia said:

Track listings

Personnel 
Deep Purple
 Ritchie Blackmore – lead guitar
 David Coverdale – vocals
 Glenn Hughes – bass guitar, vocals
 Jon Lord – keyboards, synthesizers
 Ian Paice – drums

Production
 Deep Purple – producer, mixing
 Martin Birch – engineer, mixing
 Tapani Tapanainen – assistant engineer
 Nesbit, Phipps and Froome – artwork
 Fin Costello – sleeve photography
 Candle Makers Supplies – candles
 Tony Edwards – executive producer (2004 version)
 Matthew Tait – mixing at Metropolis Studios, London (bonus tracks)
 Peter Mew – mastering at Abbey Road Studios, London (2004 version)

Charts

Weekly charts

Year-end charts

Certifications

Accolades

References 

Deep Purple albums
1974 albums
Warner Records albums
Purple Records albums